Goraghwood railway station was a railway station in County Armagh in Northern Ireland; it was opened in 1854 and closed in 1965.

Goraghwood was opened on 6 March 1854 on the Dublin and Belfast Junction Railway. From 1864 the Newry and Armagh Railway (N&A) ran trains as well to its own temporary terminus just outside Armagh until it started using the Ulster Railway's Armagh railway station in 1865.

Goraghwood was an important junction on the Dublin to Belfast railway line with branch lines to Armagh and another to Newry town station and Warrenpoint.
The line to Armagh closed in 1955 and to Newry in 1965.

Closure
The Ulster Transport Authority closed Goraghwood to freight on 4 January 1965 and to passengers on 15 February 1965.

References

Great Northern Railway (Ireland)
Disused railway stations in County Armagh
Railway stations opened in 1862
1862 establishments in Ireland
Railway stations in Northern Ireland opened in the 19th century